Jean Scrivens, (Jean Eileen Scrivens; was born 15 October 1935 in Camberwell, south London) is a retired British track and field athlete, who competed in the 100 metres. Scrivens competed for Great Britain in the 1956 Summer Olympics, held in Melbourne, Australia in the 4 × 100 m relay, where she won the silver medal, behind host nation Australia, with her team mates Anne Pashley, June Foulds and Heather Armitage.

References

External links
 
 

1935 births
Living people
British female sprinters
Olympic silver medallists for Great Britain
Athletes (track and field) at the 1956 Summer Olympics
Olympic athletes of Great Britain
Place of birth missing (living people)
Medalists at the 1956 Summer Olympics
Olympic silver medalists in athletics (track and field)
Olympic female sprinters